Flausino Rodrigues Valle, better known as Flausino Vale (Barbacena, Minas Gerais, 6 January 1894 – Belo Horizonte, 4 April 1954) was a Brazilian violinist/composer. Although he was a lawyer, he was a major researcher on Brazilian folk music. He was professor of History of Music at the Conservatório Mineiro de Música. Like Paganini, he had composed an album of 26 Preludes for solo violin in a Brazilian landscape style.

Biography 
Flausino Vale was son of Francisco Hermenegildo Rodrigues Valle and Augusta Campos Valle. He was born in Barbacena, a small city in Minas Gerais State. He never left Brazil and made few journeys to Rio de Janeiro during the first half of the 20th century.

Flausino Vale foi um compositor com idéias próprias. Autodidata e desbravador, ele conhecia perfeitamente o repertório musical de todas as épocas. Dominava com facilidade as composições para violino de Bach, Beethoven, Paganini e dos compositores da escola franco-belga. Além de ser advogado, jornalista, poeta, escritor e professor de história da música.

Recordings 
 (1994/95) Flausino Vale: Prelúdios característicos e concertantes para violino só — Prefeitura Municipal de Barbacena / FUNDAC
 (1999) Reissued in Acervo Funarte series
 (2011) Flausino Vale e o violino brasileiro — Clássicos CLA019

References 
PAULINYI, Zoltan. Escola franco-belga e o violino solo brasileiro: Flausino Vale e Marcos Salles. 178 p. Évora, Portugal, 2014. Livro disponível no Brasil pela Bookess e em Portugal: Bubok. Vídeo no YOUTUBE.

PAULINYI, Z. The first appearance of sotto le corde instruction at Flausino Vale’s Variations upon Franz Lehár’s song ‘Paganini’ for violin alone. Romênia: No. 14 plus minus. ISSN 2067-6972. 10 de junho de 2010.

ALVARENGA, Hermes Cuzzuol. Os 26 prelúdios característicos e concertantes para violino só de Flausino Vale: aspectos da linguagem musical e violinística. Porto Alegre: UFRGS. Dissertação de mestrado, 1993.
https://www.lume.ufrgs.br/bitstream/handle/10183/141532/000045498.pdf

FEICHAS,Leonardo Vieira; OSTERGREN, Eduardo. O Papel dos Instrumentista na Performance Musical: um estudo sobre o “Prelúdio 14- A Porteira da Fazenda” de Flausino Valle. Revista Cultural do Conservatóriode Tatuí - Ensaio, ano VIII, n.73, 32-35, 2012.

FEICHAS,Leonardo Vieira; OSTERGREN, Eduardo; TOKESHI, Eliane. As Fichas Interpretativas na obra de Flausino Valle: a construção de uma interpretação musical. In: Associação Nacional de Pesquisa e Pós Graduação em Música (ANPPOM), 22, 2012, João Pessoa. Anais da ANPPOM. Campinas: UNICAMP,2012, p. 1048-1055.

FEICHAS, Leonardo Vieira. Da Porteira da Fazenda ao Batuque Mineiro: o Violino Brasileiro de Flausino Valle -1.ed.- Curitiba: Editora Prismas, 2016

FRÉSCA, Camila. Flausino Vale e os 26 prelúdios característicos e concertantes para violino só. XVII Congresso da ANPPOM... (Anais). São Paulo, 2007. Disponível em: <https://web.archive.org/web/20120425071620/http://www.anppom.com.br/anais/anaiscongresso_anppom_2007/musicologia/musicol_CFresca.pdf> Accesso em: 31/5/2009.

FRÉSCA, Camila. Uma extraordinária revelação de arte: Flausino Vale e o violino brasileiro. ECA-USP: dissertação de mestrado. São Paulo, 2008.

PAULINYI, Z. Uso da técnica 'sotto le corde' como elemento surpreendente e inovador em obra para violino solo de Flausino Vale. XX Congresso da ANPPOM... (Anais). Florianópolis, 2010.

PAULINYI, Z. A afirmação do violino solo no Brasil com o álbum de seis caprichos de Marcos Salles. XX Congresso da ANPPOM... (Anais). Florianópolis, 2010.

PAULINYI, Zoltan. Flausino Vale e Marcos Salles: influências da escola franco-belga em obras brasileiras para violino solo. 197 f. Dissertação de mestrado. Departamento de Música, Universidade de Brasília, Brasília, 2010.

References 

1894 births
1954 deaths
Brazilian violinists
Composers for violin
People from Barbacena
20th-century composers
20th-century violinists
Brazilian folklorists